Barbara Schwartz (born 27 January 1979) is an Austrian former professional tennis player.

She turned professional in 1995 at the age of 16, and reached a career-high WTA ranking of 40 in November 1999, after reaching the quarterfinals at the Roland Garros that year, her best performance in a Grand Slam event.

Schwartz was unranked on the computer at the end of 2005. She retired from the tour in November 2006.

WTA career finals

Doubles: 4 (2 titles, 2 runner-ups)

ITF finals

Singles: 8 (6–2)

Doubles: 6 (6–0)

References

External links
 
 
 
 

1979 births
Living people
Austrian female tennis players
People from Mödling District
Tennis players from Vienna
Sportspeople from Lower Austria